Yaroslav Ivanovych Zheleznyak (born 8 September 1976) is a Ukrainian economist and politician. From 2017 to 2019, he was an adviser to Prime Minister Volodymyr Groysman. In the 2019 Ukrainian parliamentary election he was elected as a People's Deputy of Ukraine of the 9th convocation from the Holos party.

References

1989 births
Ninth convocation members of the Verkhovna Rada
Living people
Politicians from Mariupol
Voice (Ukrainian political party) politicians
21st-century  Ukrainian  economists